The Mayworth School, also known as Cramerton School, is a historic school complex located at 236 Eighth Ave. in Cramerton, Gaston County, North Carolina.  It was designed by architect Stuart W. Cramer and built in 1921 in the Classical Revival style.  It is a two- and three-story red brick building with a hipped roof and pedimented portico.  A two-story rear wing was added in 1930.  Also located on the property are the contributing gymnasium (1939) and swimming pool (1945).

It was listed on the National Register of Historic Places in 2002.

References

School buildings on the National Register of Historic Places in North Carolina
Neoclassical architecture in North Carolina
School buildings completed in 1921
Buildings and structures in Gaston County, North Carolina
National Register of Historic Places in Gaston County, North Carolina
1921 establishments in North Carolina